Pilus is a genus of sea snails, marine gastropod mollusks in the family Bathysciadiidae .

Species
Species within the genus Pilus include:
 Pilus conicus (Verrill, 1884)

References

 Gofas, S.; Le Renard, J.; Bouchet, P. (2001). Mollusca, in: Costello, M.J. et al. (Ed.) (2001). European register of marine species: a check-list of the marine species in Europe and a bibliography of guides to their identification. Collection Patrimoines Naturels, 50: pp. 180–213

Pseudococculinidae
Monotypic gastropod genera